Clark House is a historic home located at Poughkeepsie, Dutchess County, New York.  It was built about 1919 and is a -story, three-bay-wide concrete block Bungalow style dwelling with a gable roof and wide dormer.  It features a porch with Doric order columns, massive deep eaves, and half-timbering.

It was added to the National Register of Historic Places in 1982.

References

Houses on the National Register of Historic Places in New York (state)
American Craftsman architecture in New York (state)
Houses completed in 1919
Houses in Poughkeepsie, New York
National Register of Historic Places in Poughkeepsie, New York